Governor Marland may refer to:

E. W. Marland (1874–1941), 10th Governor of Oklahoma
William C. Marland (1918–1965), 24th Governor of West Virginia